The Athletics at the 2016 Summer Paralympics – Women's 400 metres T20 event at the 2016 Paralympic Games took place on 13 September 2016, at the Estádio Olímpico João Havelange.

Heats

Heat 1 
17:50 12 September 2016:

Heat 2 
17:56 12 September 2016:

Final 
17:46 13 September 2016:

Notes

Athletics at the 2016 Summer Paralympics